The mission of the 710th Combat Operations Squadron, Joint Base Langley-Eustis, Virginia, is to provide trained, combat mission-ready AOC warriors to the CENTCOM CFACC.  The 710th COS is aligned to U.S. Air Forces, Central Command. When deployed, 710th COS members provide continuity and expertise to augment the active duty Air Operations Center force.

The squadron was established as the 710th Bombardment Squadron, a heavy bomber squadron.  After training in the United States, it deployed to the European Theatre of Operations, where it participated in the strategic bombing campaign against Germany.  It returned to the United States and was inactivated in November 1945.

The 710th Airlift Squadron was reactivated and redesignated in 1968.  It was an associate airlift squadron of the 60th Air Mobility Wing, assigned to the 349th Operations Group at Travis Air Force Base, California, where it was inactivated on 1 January 1998.

History

World War II

Training in the United States
The squadron was first activated on 1 May 1943 at Ephrata Army Air Base, Washington as the 710th Bombardment Squadron, one of the four original squadrons of the 447th Bombardment Group.

The original mission of the squadron was to be an Operational Training Unit. However, by the time the 447th Group reached full strength in October it had been identified for overseas deployment and its key personnel were sent to the Army Air Forces School of Applied Tactics at Orlando Army Air Base, Florida for advanced tactical training. The cadre trained at Brooksville Army Air Field with the 1st Bombardment Squadron, engaging in simulated attacks against Mobile, Alabama, Charleston, South Carolina and New Orleans. The squadron then trained at Rapid City Army Air Base, South Dakota with the 17th Bombardment Training Wing. In June 1943 the unit moved to Harvard Army Air Field, Nebraska for Phase I training. The squadron's B-17s began to move from the United States to the European theater of operations in November 1943.

Combat in the European Theater

The squadron was stationed at RAF Rattlesden, England, from December 1943 to August 1945. It flew its first combat mission on 24 December 1943 against a V-1 flying bomb launch site near Saint-Omer in Northern France.

From December 1943 to May 1944, the squadron helped prepare for the invasion of the European continent by attacking submarine pens, naval installations, and cities in Germany; missile sites and ports in France; and airfields and marshaling yards in France, Belgium and Germany. The squadron conducted heavy bombardment missions against German aircraft industry during Big Week, 20 to 25 February 1944.

The unit supported Operation Overlord, the invasion of Normandy in June 1944 by bombing airfields and other targets. On D-Day the squadron bombed the beachhead area using pathfinder aircraft.

The squadron aided in Operation Cobra, the breakthrough at Saint Lo, France, and the effort to take Brest, France, from July to September 1944. It bombed strategic targets from October to December 1944, concentrating on sources of oil production. It assaulted marshalling yards, railroad bridges and communication centers during the Battle of the Bulge from December 1944 to January 1945. In March 1945 the group bombed an airfield in support of Operation Varsity, the airborne assault across the Rhine.  The unit flew its last combat mission on 21 April 1945 against a marshalling yard at Ingolstadt, Germany.

The 710th redeployed to the United States during the summer 1945. The air echelon ferried their aircraft and personnel back to the United States, leaving on 29 and 30 June 1945. The squadron ground echelon, along with the group headquarters and 708th squadron sailed on the SS Joseph T. Robinson on 1 August 1945, from Liverpool.  Most personnel were discharged at Camp Myles Standish after arrival at the port of Boston.  A small cadre proceeded to Drew Field, Florida and the squadron inactivated on 7 November 1945.

Reserve airlift operations
By 1968, the Air Force Reserve formed associate units.  In this program, reserve units flew and maintained aircraft owned by an associated regular unit. The squadron was redesignated the 710th Military Airlift Squadron and activated under the 349th Military Airlift Wing as an associate of Military Airlift Command's 60th Military Airlift Wing at Travis Air Force Base, California in the spring of 1973.  The squadron flew the 60th Wing's Lockheed C-141 Starlifters on worldwide transport missions.  The squadron provided support to the State of California during the 1992 Los Angeles riots. The squadron was inactivated in 1998 as part of phaseout of C-141s.

Global War on Terror
In 2004, the unit was reactivated and redesignated the 710th Combat Operations Squadron.  From that point on, it would serve as one of the designated reserve components of the 609th AOC in the CENTCOM theater, as well as rendering assistance to other AOC units around the world.

Lineage
 Constituted as the 710th Bombardment Squadron (Heavy) on 6 April 1943
 Activated on 1 May 1943
 Redesignated 710th Bombardment Squadron, Heavy on 20 August 1943
 Inactivated on 7 November 1945
 Redesignated 710th Military Airlift Squadron (Associate) on 19 June 1973
 Activated in the reserve on 1 July 1973
 Redesignated 710th Airlift Squadron (Associate) on 1 February 1992
 Redesignated 710th Airlift Squadron on 1 October 1994
 Inactivated on 1 January 1998
 Reactivated on 1 March 2004 and Redesignated 710th Combat Operations Squadron

Assignments
 447th Bombardment Group, 1 May 1943 – 7 November 1945
 349th Military Airlift Wing (later 349th Airlift Wing), 1 July 1973
 349th Operations Group, 1 August 1992 – 1 January 1998
 610th Air Operations Group, March Air Reserve Base, California, 1 March 2004

Stations

 Ephrata Army Air Base, Washington, 1 May 1943
 Rapid City Army Air Base, South Dakota, 13 June 1943
 Harvard Army Air Field, Nebraska, 1 August 1943 – 11 November 1943

 RAF Rattlesden (AAF-126), England, 1 December 1943-c. 1 August 1945
 Drew Field, Florida, 14 August-7 November 1945
 Travis Air Force Base, California, 1 July 1973 – 15 November 1997

 Langley Air Force Base, Virginia, 1 March 2004 – Present

Aircraft
 Boeing B-17 Flying Fortress, 1943–1945
 Lockheed C-141 Starlifter, 1973–1997

Awards and Campaigns

See also

References

Notes
 Explanatory notes

 Citations

Bibliography

 
 
 
 
 
 
 
 AF Pamphlet 900-2, Unit Decorations, Awards and Campaign Participation Credits, Vol II Department of the Air Force, Washington, DC, 30 September 1976
 710th Combat Operations Squadron

Further reading

External links

Military units and formations of the United States Air Force Reserves
Airlift squadrons of the United States Air Force